Ross Martin (16 May 1943 – 2 July 2011) was an Australian cross-country skier who competed at the 1968 Winter Olympics. He came 60th out of 72 competitors in the 15 km event and 60th out of 63 in the 30 km event.

References

External links
Ross Martin's profile at Sports Reference.com
Ross Martin's obituary

Australian male cross-country skiers
Olympic cross-country skiers of Australia
Cross-country skiers at the 1968 Winter Olympics
1943 births
2011 deaths
20th-century Australian people